The 2017–18 Basketball Championship of Bosnia and Herzegovina is the 17th season of this championship, with 12 teams from Bosnia and Herzegovina participating in it. Igokea, the defending champion, will join the tournament directly in the second stage.

The competition will start on 14 October 2017 and will end on 12, 16 or 19 May 2018 depending on the number of matches played in the finals.

Competition format
Twelve teams would join the regular season, where the first five teams qualified for the Liga 6 with Igokea, that plays the season's ABA League First Division.

On 18 September 2017, the Basketball Federation of Bosnia and Herzegovina released the calendar of the regular season.

Teams and locations

Regular season

Second stage

Group 1–6

Group 7–12

Playoffs
Seeded teams played games 1, 3 and 5 at home.

References

External links
Official website

Basketball Championship of Bosnia and Herzegovina
Bosnia
Bas